Santo Ildefonso is a former civil parish in the municipality of Porto, Portugal. In 2013, the parish merged into the new parish Cedofeita, Santo Ildefonso, Sé, Miragaia, São Nicolau e Vitória. The population in 2011 was 9,029, in an area of 1.24 km².

References

Former parishes of Porto